Erlbach is a village and a former municipality in the Vogtlandkreis district, in Saxony, Germany. Since 1 January 2014, it is part of the town Markneukirchen.

References

External links 
 

Former municipalities in Saxony
Markneukirchen